Laze & Royal, also known as Bennett & Justyn (and previously known as 2XL), are a Multi-Platinum American production duo from Beverly Hills, California, made up of twin brothers Bennett Armstrong and Justyn Armstrong, both of whom are currently part of the musical group My Crazy Girlfriend.

Discography

Albums
 Neighborhood Rapstar (2007)

Mixtapes
2009: When Worlds Collide Vol. 1 (hosted by DJ Vlad)
2009: Kiss Myself Goodbye (hosted by DJ Ill Will & DJ Rockstar)
2010: When Worlds Collide Vol. 2
2010: Kiss Myself Goodbye 2
2011: Loaded
2012: Wasted

Singles 

Unreleased/released productions
Kesha - "Let My Love Go"
Kesha - "Leave It Alone"
Kesha - "Ur Not My Daddy"
Taeyeon - "I"
Taeyeon - "Fire"
Bruno Mars - "All She Knows"
Tyga feat. The Game - "Switch Lanes"
Tyga - "Echo"
Tyga - "Circus"
Tyga - "Where Am I"
Melody Day - "Kiss on the Lips"
My Crazy Girlfriend - "Crazy Stupid Love"
My Crazy Girlfriend - "Go Fuck Yourself"
2XL feat. E-40 - "Kitty Kat"
2XL feat. LAX - "Know Better"
2XL feat. Cherish & DJ Unk - "Magic City"
Laze & Royal - "Like a Pistol" (feat. Marty James)
Laze & Royal - "Marilyn Monroe (feat. Tyler Sherritt)
Eva feat. Gucci Mane - "Not My Daddy"
Eva feat. Tyga - "Body on Mine"
YG - "This Year" (co-produced with Antonio Jackson)
Privaledge feat. Nipsey Hussle - "Cold"
Atozzio - "Unhealthy Love"
James Cappra Jr - "Down the Drain - Pretty Little Liars"

References

External links
 Official homepage
Laze & Royal's official justRHYMES.com profile

African-American male rappers
Hip hop groups from California
American musical duos
Hip hop duos
Musical groups established in 2006
Musical groups from Los Angeles
Identical twin males
Twin musical duos
American identical twins
Male musical duos